is a 1963 Japanese action film directed by Toshiro Mifune in his sole directorial credit. The film stars Mifune, Tatsuya Mihashi, Tsutomu Yamazaki, Sachio Sakai, Yoshio Tsuchiya, Yoshifumi Tajima, Tatsuya Nakadai, Mie Hama and Yuriko Hoshi. In the film, a man who battled in the Philippines during World War II is kidnapped by two brothers in search of the gold he buried on an island in the Philippines during the war.

Cast 

 Toshiro Mifune as Takeichi Matsuo
 Tatsuya Mihashi as Keigo Gunji
 Tsutomu Yamazaki as Tsukuda
 Sachio Sakai as Igarashi
 Yoshifumi Tajima as Yasumoto
 Tatsuya Nakadai as Mitsuru Gunji
 Yoshio Tsuchiya as Yamazaki
 Mie Hama as Igorot native
 Yuriko Hoshi as Masako Matsuo
 Tetsu Nakamura as an oriental man
 Keiko Yamada as Baker's spouse
 Michiko Hayashi as a female clerk

References

External links 

 
 

1963 films
1960s Japanese films
1960s action films
1960s action drama films
1960s action war films
Japanese epic films
Japanese war films
Films set in the Philippines
War epic films
Toho tokusatsu films
Toho films
Japanese-language films